Susan E. Henking (born 1955) is an American religious studies scholar. She was the 14th and final president of Shimer College in Chicago, appointed in July 2012 and finishing in 2017. She then served in interim roles at Salem Academy and College, including Interim President in 2020/2021. 

Henking was the first female president of Shimer – a small great books college – since its 19th-century founder, Frances Shimer, ceded control to the University of Chicago in 1896.  Henking is one of the small number of openly lesbian college presidents.

During her five years at Shimer, Henking blogged on higher education and other topics on The Huffington Post and ChicagoNow. She was also a contributor to Religion Dispatches, an online magazine of religion, politics and culture.

Education
Henking received her Bachelor of Arts degree from Duke University in 1977 and her Master of Arts degree from the University of Chicago Divinity School in 1979.  She received her PhD from the University of Chicago Divinity School in 1988, and began teaching at Hobart and William Smith Colleges in 1988. Her doctoral dissertation was titled Protestant Religious Experience and the Rise of American Sociology: A Contextual Study of Varieties of Secularization.

Career
Henking taught at Hobart and William Smith Colleges, principally in the field of religious studies. She also taught in women's studies.  In 1992 she received the Faculty Distinguished Teaching Award. During her time at the Colleges, Henking served on the Board of the American Academy of Religion and as founding editor of the Oxford University Press series Teaching Religious Studies also of the American Academy of Religion. Henking was the interim Dean of Faculty from 1998 to 2001. She headed the Department of Religious Studies from 2002 to 2005 and 2008 to 2009. In addition, before her departure in the summer of 2012, she served as adviser to the Board of Trustees.

Henking has written and taught in the field of LGBT studies. Often her work has been at the junction of LGBT studies and religious studies, as in  Religion the volume she co-edited in 1997 with Gary David Comstock.  She co-chaired the program in LGBT studies at Hobart and William Smith, which was the first such program in the nation to offer a major.

In early 2012, Henking was chosen to become the 14th president of Shimer College. She was the first regular president of Shimer College after the acrimonious departure of Thomas Lindsay in 2010.

After her time at Shimer, Henking continued to work in higher education including as an Interim President at Salem Academy and College from June 2020 through June 2021. She also continues to publish in religious studies and in areas related to higher education. Starting July 1, 2022, Henking became Vice President for Academic and Student Affairs at Wells College.

Selected works 
1992: "Protestant Religious Experience and the Rise of American Sociology," Journal of the History of the Behavioral Sciences 28(4): 325-339.
1993: "Rejected, Reclaimed, Renamed: Mary Daly on Psychology and Religion," Journal of Psychology and Theology 21(3): 199-207.
1996: "The Open Secret: Dilemmas of Advocacy in the (Religious Studies) Classroom." pp. 245–259 in Advocacy in the Classroom: Propaganda versus Engagement, Patricia Meyers Spacks ed. (New York: St. Martin's Press).
1996: "Proselytizing and Pedagogy", Religious Studies News 11, p. 8.
1997: Susan Henking and Gary David Comstock, eds. Que(e)rying Religion: A Critical Anthology (New York: Continuum)
2000: "Does (the History of ) Religion and Psychological Studies Have a Subject?" in Mapping Religion and Psychological Studies, Diane Jonte-Pace and William Parsons eds. (New York: Routledge).
2000: "Who is the Public Intellectual? Identity, Marginality, and the Religious Studies Scholar." ARC: Journal of the Faculty of Religious Studies, McGill University 28 (2000): 159-171.
2004: "Religion, Religious Studies and Higher Education: Into the 21st Century," Religious Studies Review 30(2,3): 129-136.
2006: "Difficult Knowledges: Gender, Sexuality, Religion," Spotlight on Teaching, October 2006.
2008: Susan Henking, Diane Jonte Pace, William Parsons, eds.  Mourning Religion (University of Virginia Press). 
2008:“More than a Quarter Century: HIV/AIDS and Religion,” Religious Studies Review 34(3) pp. 129ff.  
2014. “Reflections from Prestigious Leaders LGBTQ in Higher Education,” Journal of Psychological Issues in Organizational Culture 5(1): pp. 60ff.

References

External links
Official Shimer College profile
Presidential blog
Hobart and William Smith Colleges faculty profile
2012 interview on Out of Bounds Radio

Presidents of Shimer College
Hobart and William Smith Colleges faculty
University of Chicago Divinity School alumni
LGBT studies academics
Living people
American women bloggers
American bloggers
1955 births
Women heads of universities and colleges
Lesbian academics
American women academics
21st-century American women